Lexington High School is located in Lexington, Ohio, United States. The school serves grades 9-12 and is the only high school in the Lexington Local School District. It has received an "Outstanding" ranking for an outstanding eleven consecutive years by the Ohio Board of Education as a result of standardized test scores.

School characteristics
 Colors: Purple and gold
 Nickname: Minutemen
 Athletic conference: Ohio Cardinal Conference
 Superintendent: Jeremy Secrist
 OHSAA Division II and III athletics

Ohio High School Athletic Association State Championships

  Boys' basketball – 1989, 1991
 Girls' cross country - 2015, 2017, 2018, 2019,2020
 Boys' cross country - 2015, 2017

Notable alumni

 Jamie Feick, retired professional basketball player
 David Leslie Johnson-McGoldrick, Hollywood screenwriter and producer
 Drew Kasper, professional wrestler
 Jacob Kasper, professional wrestler
 Sylvia McNair, American opera singer (soprano) and classical recitalist who has also achieved notable success in the Broadway and cabaret genres.
 Hannah Stevens, 2017 United States National Champion, 3x US National Team member, 10th fastest woman in US history in 100M backstroke

References

External links
 Lexington Local Schools profile—City-Data.com

High schools in Richland County, Ohio
Public high schools in Ohio